Crescendo is a 2019 German drama film directed by Dror Zahavi. It premiered at the Munich International Film Festival on July 3, 2019, where it received a 10-minute standing ovation. It opened to the public in Germany on January 16, 2020, and is scheduled for release in American cinemas in June by Menemsha Films. Due to the ongoing COVID-19 pandemic, the film will be released in virtual cinema starting May 1. The film received the 2020 Cinema for Peace Honorary Award.

The film is inspired by the real-life story of Daniel Barenboim's West–Eastern Divan Orchestra.

Plot
A world-famous conductor, Eduard Sporck, is approached by Karla de Fries to put together an Israeli-Palestinian youth orchestra for a peace performance. He accepts, but first he must have his group overcome their beliefs, fears, and bigotry in order to come together.

Cast

References

External links
 
 

2019 films
2010s Arabic-language films
2010s English-language films
Films about classical music and musicians
Films set in Frankfurt
Films set in Tel Aviv
Films set in Trentino-Alto Adige/Südtirol
Films set in the West Bank
German drama films
2010s German-language films
2010s Hebrew-language films
2019 multilingual films
German multilingual films
2010s German films